USS Justice may refer to one of several United States Navy ships:

 , an  laid down as ATR-20; transferred to the Royal Navy under lend-lease and commissioned as HMS Justice (W-140); returned to the U.S. Navy  in 1946; reclassified as BATR-20; sold in 1947.
 , an unofficial name of USS YP-678.

United States Navy ship names